Mateus Cupertino Costa (born 1 January 1970) is the current interim manager of I-League club Churchill Brothers.

Coaching career
On 10 January 2015, it was revealed that Costa had been coaching Sporting Clube de Goa in the Federation Cup after the dismissal Óscar Bruzón. Costa lead Sporting Goa to the semi-finals of the Federation Cup where they lost 3–0 to eventual champions, Bengaluru FC.

In 2020, he appointed as new head coach of Churchill Brothers, after the sacked Portuguese manager Bernardo Tavares.

Managerial statistics

References

Living people
1970 births

Indian football managers
Sporting Clube de Goa managers
I-League managers
Churchill Brothers FC Goa managers